Dendrolaelaspis longisetosus is a species of mite in the family Digamasellidae.

References

Digamasellidae
Animals described in 1977